The 1915 Mississippi College Collegians football team was an American football team that represented Mississippi College as a member of the Southern Intercollegiate Athletic Association (SIAA) during the 1915 college football season. In their third year under head coach Dana X. Bible, the team compiled a 4–3–1 record.

Schedule

References

Mississippi College
Mississippi College Choctaws football seasons
Mississippi College Collegians football